The 1934 Utah State Aggies football team was an American football team that represented Utah State Agricultural College in the Rocky Mountain Conference (RMC) during the 1934 college football season. In their 16th season under head coach Dick Romney, the Aggies compiled a 5–1–1, finished fourth in the RMC, and outscored all opponents by a total of 131 to 42.

Center Elmer "Bear" Ward was selected as a first-team All-American by the Newspaper Enterprise Association; he was the first Utah State player to be selected as a first-team All-American. Three Utah State players received first-team all-conference honors in 1934: Ward; fullback Kent Ryan; and end Joe Whitesides.

Schedule

References

Utah State
Utah State Aggies football seasons
Utah State Aggies football